Gentleman caller may refer to:
Boyfriend
The character in the Tennessee Williams play The Glass Menagerie (1944) and several Hollywood productions